Istanbul UFO Museum was the fourth international UFO museum, and is located in the Beyoğlu district of Istanbul, Turkey. Founded by Haktan Akdoğan's Sirius UFO Space Sciences Research Center in 2001, the museum contains various photos, videos, reports, UFO-alien models, and a library about UFO's and extraterrestrial life.

In 2011, the museum reportedly had a mobile version, which travelled around Istanbul in a truck. The museum is no longer open.

See also
List of UFO organizations

References

External links
 Istanbul UFO Museum - Homepage

Museums established in 2001
Museums in Istanbul
UFO organizations
2001 establishments in Turkey
Beyoğlu